Cimex adjunctus, is an ectoparasite found in a wide range of North America. Like other insects in the genus Cimex, C. adjunctus is a temporary parasite that eats blood. Temporary, meaning that they do not linger on their hosts between meals. C. adjunctus feed off of many insectivorous bat species. On more than one occasion, these insects have been found on the wings of Eptesicus fuscus (big brown bat).

References

Further reading

 
 

Cimicidae
Articles created by Qbugbot
Insects described in 1939